The Glass Wall is a 1953 American drama film noir directed by Maxwell Shane and starring Vittorio Gassman and Gloria Grahame.  The black-and-white film was produced and distributed by Columbia Pictures. The title refers to a design feature of the United Nations headquarters in New York City.

It tied with two other films for the 1953 Golden Leopard, the top prize at the Locarno International Film Festival.

Plot
Peter Kuban is a Hungarian displaced person and survivor of World War II Nazi concentration camps. He stows away in Trieste (at the time of the film's release a city divided between Italy and Yugoslavia) on a ship bound for New York City. However, he is spotted by ship officials and held for American authorities. When the ship arrives in New York City, he claims that he qualifies for entry under an exception for those who helped Allied soldiers during the war, but all he knows about the paratrooper he hid from the enemy is that his name is Tom and he plays clarinet in a jazz band in New York City's Times Square. The immigration authorities, led by Inspector Bailey, say that without better documentation he must be sent back to communist Hungary on the same ship, which departs the next morning.

Kuban escapes by leaping off the ship to the dock below, but breaks some ribs, then begins his search for Tom in Times Square nightclubs. Peter’s picture and a caption of him being wanted as a stowaway who jumped ship is plastered over the entire front page of the city’s tabloids.

He encounters an unemployed factory worker named Maggie in a restaurant. When she steals a coat off a rack she is spotted and flees. Peter follows after her and helps her elude the police. They go to her apartment, where she tends his injury as best she can and learns his story. When her landlady, Mrs. Hinckley, threatens to evict her for being behind on her rent, Peter gives Maggie all the money he has. Eddie, the landlady's bullying son, barges in and tries to have his way with Maggie. Peter bursts out of hiding and starts fighting him, but gets pummeled. Maggie knocks Eddie out with a chair and flees with Peter.

The Hinckleys notify the police, claiming Peter was the attacker. He is subsequently pursued by the authorities for aggravated assault, described as dangerous and possibly armed. Meanwhile, Tom discovers Peter's picture on a discarded newspaper. He wants to go to the immigration department, but his pushy, marriage-bent girlfriend Nancy persuades him to attend an important audition instead. Tom impresses band leader Jack Teagarden, but leaves abruptly to try to help Peter.

The fleeing couple attempt to hide out in the subway, but are recognized. The police grab Maggie, but Peter gets away. While being questioned by authorities she meets up with Tom. After hearing his story, Inspector Bailey believes Peter’s story, but only if they can reach him before the ship departs at 7 am. After that, by law, Peter will be guilty of a felony for jumping ship, deported, and forever ineligible to be admitted to America. The trio drive around searching for him. Gravely suffering from his injuries, Peter slips into an unoccupied taxi and collapses. When burlesque dancer Tanya gets into it after work, she recognizes him from the newspaper photo. She takes him to her apartment for rest and a meal. When he asks why, she explains that her real name is Bella Zakoyla, and that she is a fellow "Hunky". Her immigrant mother approves, but her petty criminal brother fears police becoming involved, saying Peter’s plight is the responsibility of the United Nations. Their loud argument rouses him from fitful sleep in the next room. He slips away, leaving a note apologizing to Tanya for causing her so much trouble.

Acting on Freddie's assertion, Peter heads toward the United Nations building in the early morning hours. He is recognized on the way and the police are put directly on his trail.  Maggie, Tom, Bailey, and a pair of officers pursue Peter through the halls of the U.N. Unable to find anyone to help him, he delivers a soliloquy to an empty meeting room with places marked for representatives of the U.N.'s member states. He calls for recognition that peace and freedom for the world require peace and freedom for every individual. After more desperate flight Peter panics and heads to the roof, where he ascends a parapet wall to jump. Maggie and Tom reach him and at the last instant the sound of Tom's voice causes Peter to collapse backwards onto the roof. All reassure Peter that he is now safe.

Cast

In addition, Elizabeth Slifer and Richard Reeves played the Hinckley mother and son, while Joseph Turkel and Else Neft played the Zakoyla brother and mother. Michael Fox did double duty as Toomey and the narrator.

Background
The film was shot on location in New York City, including at the United Nations building (the "glass wall" of the title) on First Avenue at 46th Street in Manhattan.

Reception
In 2011, film critic Dennis Schwartz wrote, "Columbia's off-beat postwar noir project, whose title is taken from the U.N.'s glass wall, turned out rather well ..."

The Glass Wall shared the Golden Leopard, the top prize of the Locarno International Film Festival in 1953 with Julius Caesar and The Composer Glinka (Kompozitor Glinka).

References

External links
 
 
 
 

1953 films
1953 drama films
American black-and-white films
American drama films
Columbia Pictures films
Film noir
Films about the United Nations
Films directed by Maxwell Shane
Films scored by Leith Stevens
Films set in New York City
Golden Leopard winners
1950s English-language films
1950s American films